The 1888 New York Athletic Club football team was an American football team that represented the New York Athletic Club in the American Football Union (AFU) during the 1888 college football season. The New York team compiled a 1–3–1 record (all against AFU opponents).

Schedule

References

New York Athletic Club
New York Athletic Club football seasons
New York Athletic Club football